The Governor General's Award for French-language children's illustration is a Canadian literary award that annually recognizes one Canadian illustrator for a children's book written in French. It is one of four children's book awards among the Governor General's Awards for Literary Merit, one each for writers and illustrators of English- and French-language books. The Governor General's Awards program is administered by the Canada Council.

In name, this award is part of the Governor General's Award program only from 1987 but the four children's literature awards were established in 1975 under a Canada Council name. In the event, the "Canada Council" and "Governor General's" awards have recognized illustration in a French-language children's book every year from 1977.

Canada Council Children's Literature Prize 

In 1975 the Canada Council established four annual prizes of $5000 for the year's best English- and French-language children's books by Canadian writers and illustrators. Those "Canada Council Children's Literature Prizes" were continued under the "Governor General's Awards" rubric from 1987, and continue today. Among them the French-language illustration prize was awarded every year from 1977.

 1977: Claude Lafortune, L'évangile en papier, written by Henriette Major
 1978: Ginette Anfousse, La varicelle
 1979: Roger Paré, Une fenêtre dans ma tête, by Raymond Plante
 1980: Miyuki Tanobi, Les gens de mon pays, by Gilles Vigneault
 1981: Joanne Ouellet, Les Papinacois, by Michel Noël
 1982: Darcia Labrosse, by Marie José Thériault
 1983: Philippe Béha, Petit ours (Grand-maman, Où est ma tétine?, Mon bébé-soeur, Quand ça va mal), by Sylvie Assathiany and Louise Pelletier
 1984: Marie-Louise Gay, Drôle d'école (Rond comme ton visage, Blanc comme neige, Petit et grand, Un Léopard dans mon placard)
 1985: Roger Paré, L'alphabet
 1986: Stéphane Poulin, Album de famille and As-tu vu Joséphine?

1980s

1990s

2000s

2010s

2020s

See also 

 Governor General's Award for French-language children's literature
 Governor General's Award for English-language children's illustration
 Governor General's Award for English-language children's literature

References

French
Awards established in 1987
1987 establishments in Canada
Children
Picture book awards
French-language literary awards